Hypophylloceras is a Cretaceous ammonite with a finely ribbed, compressed, involute shell; some having periodic stronger ribs or folds. The suture is complex, with large, asymmetric and finely divided lobes; the 1st lateral being much larger than the external (=ventral) and 2nd lateral lobes. Saddle endings commonly not phylloid.

Hypophylloceras includes Neophylloceras Shimizu 1934 (=Paraphylloceras Chimisu 1935 ), Hyporbulites Brestroffer 1947, Goretophylloceras Collingnon 1949 and Aphrotiticeras Mahmoud in Breister, 1952.

The type species Hypophylloceras ononense, named by Salfeld in 1924 and based on Phylloceras ononense Santon 1895, comes from the Aptian of California.

References

Imlay 1960. Early Cretaceous (albian) Ammonites from the Chitina Valley and Talkeetna Mountains, Alaska. US Geological Survey PP 354-D
Hypophylloceras entry in the Paleobiology Database 5/02/12

Cretaceous ammonites
Ammonitida
Ammonites of North America
Valanginian genus first appearances
Hauterivian genera
Barremian genera
Aptian genera
Albian genera
Cenomanian genera
Turonian genera
Coniacian genera
Santonian genera
Campanian genera
Maastrichtian genus extinctions
Fossil taxa described in 1924